Biharamulo is a town in northwestern Tanzania. It is the district headquarter of Biharamulo District. Biharamulo used to be a German administrative centre in colonial times. Biharamulo Game Reserve is located north of the town.

History
The town was the administrative centre of German East Africa during the late 19th century until World War I. Since then it has remained part of the Biharamulo District.

Transport
Trunk road T4 from Mwanza to Bukoba passes by the town and trunk road T9 to Kigoma Region start in Biharamulo.

Population
According to the 2012 national census the population of Biharamulo town - 'Biharamulo Mjini' ward - is 24,573.

Politics
Biharamulo has a unique political trend whereby it is difficult for a member of Parliament to save to natural retirement. Previously Biharamulo included Chato division before Chato was upgraded to a district. Members of Parliament for Biharamulo include Chief Stanslaus Rugaba Kasusura (1965 - 1985); Phares Kashemeza Kabuye (1985 - 1995, 2005 - 2009); Anatory Kasazi Choya (1995 - 2005); Oscar Rwegasira Mukasa (2009 - 2010, 2015 - 2020); Anthony Gervas Mbasa (2010 - 2015); Ezra John Chilewesa (from 2020...)

Climate

References

External links
 
Populated places in Kagera Region